Qiziltepa District is a district of Navoiy Region in Uzbekistan. The capital lies at the city Qiziltepa. The district consists of one city (Qiziltepa), 12 urban-type settlements (Husbuddin, Qalayn-Azizon, Baland Gʻardiyon, Gʻoyibon, Oq soch, Vangʻozi, Oqmachit, Zarmitan (Town), Gʻamxoʻr, Uzilishkent, Oʻrtaqoʻrgʻon, Xoʻjaqoʻrgʻon) and 8 rural communities.

References

Navoiy Region
Districts of Uzbekistan